The 1980–81 Chicago Black Hawks season was the 55th season of operation of the Chicago Black Hawks in the National Hockey League.

Offseason
At the 1980 NHL Entry Draft, the Black Hawks had the third overall pick, and selected Denis Savard from the Montreal Juniors of the QMJHL.  In 72 games with the Juniors, Savard had 63 goals and 181 points during the 1979-80 season.

The club replaced head coach Eddie Johnston, as former Black Hawks defenceman and captain Keith Magnuson was named the new head coach of the team.  Magnuson appeared in 589 games with Chicago from 1969-1980.

Regular season
The Black Hawks had a tough first half of the season, as the club had a record of 12-22-6 through their first 40 games, clinging on to the fourth and final playoff position in the Smythe Division. The Black Hawks then went 14-2-4 in their next 20 games, which included an eight-game winning streak, to improve their overall record to 26-24-10, and second place in the division.  Chicago would finish their final 20 game stretch with a 5-9-6 record, finishing the season with a 31-33-16 record, earning 78 points, and maintaining second place in the Smythe Division, 31 points behind the division winners, the St. Louis Blues.

Offensively, Tom Lysiak led the club with 76 points, as he scored 21 goals and 55 assists.  Rookie Denis Savard finished one point behind, scoring 28 goals and 75 points, while having a team best +27 rating.  Darryl Sutter led the Black Hawks with 40 goals, while earning 62 points, and Reg Kerr had 30 goals and 60 points in 70 games.  Terry Ruskowski chipped in with 59 points, while leading Chicago with 225 penalty minutes.  On the blueline, Bob Murray led the scoring, getting 13 goals and 60 points, while Doug Wilson had 12 goals and 51 points.

In goal, Tony Esposito led the way, earning a 29-23-14 record in 66 games, posting a 3.75 GAA.

Final standings

Playoffs
The Black Hawks opened the playoffs with a best-of-five preliminary series against the Calgary Flames.  The Flames finished the season with a 39-27-14 record, earning 92 points, 14 more than Chicago, and a third place finish in the Patrick Division.  The series opened with two games at the Calgary Corral, and in the first game, the Black Hawks were led by two goals by Darryl Sutter, but it wasn't enough as the Flames held on for a 4-3 victory.  In the second game, the Flames dominated the Hawks, defeating Chicago 6-2, as Calgary was led by goaltender Reggie Lemelin, who made 38 saves.  The series moved to Chicago Stadium for the third game, as the Flames took a 4-2 lead going into the third period.  The Black Hawks tied the game on goals by Al Secord and Darryl Sutter to force overtime, however, in double overtime, Willi Plett of the Flames scored, as Calgary completed the series sweep.

Schedule and results

Calgary Flames 3, Chicago Black Hawks 0

Player statistics

Regular season
Scoring

Goaltending

Playoffs
Scoring

Goaltending

Note: Pos = Position; GP = Games played; G = Goals; A = Assists; Pts = Points; +/- = plus/minus; PIM = Penalty minutes; PPG = Power-play goals; SHG = Short-handed goals; GWG = Game-winning goals
      MIN = Minutes played; W = Wins; L = Losses; T = Ties; GA = Goals-against; GAA = Goals-against average; SO = Shutouts;

Awards and records

Transactions

Draft picks
Chicago's draft picks at the 1980 NHL Entry Draft held at the Montreal Forum in Montreal, Quebec.

Farm teams

See also
1980–81 NHL season

References

 

Chicago Blackhawks seasons
Chicago Blackhawks
Chicago Blackhawks
Chicago
Chicago